The Windsor Boys' School is a comprehensive all-boys upper school and sixth form located on Maidenhead Road in Windsor, Berkshire, England, within the Royal Borough of Windsor and Maidenhead Local Authority. The school specialises in the arts.

History
Previously known as Windsor Grammar School, the school celebrated its 100th anniversary on 22 September 2008. It moved to the current site in 1939 officially opened by Alexander Cambridge, 1st Earl of Athlone on 18 January 1939.

It welcomed its first non-selective pupils in 1977, completing its transition from a grammar school into a comprehensive school.

On 1 March 2015 the school, together with Windsor Girls' School, became an academy within the Windsor Learning Partnership multi-academy trust.

Houses
All students in the school are affiliated to one of the eight houses:
 Allen
 Burgess
 Burnett
 Ford
 Lambdin
 Ottrey
 Warwick
 Woodland
Each of the eight houses is named after an old boy who died in either the First or Second World Wars.

Sports

The Windsor Boys' School has an active sports programme, and is particularly known for its performances in rugby, football and rowing.

Rowing
Windsor Boys' School Boat Club (opened in 1940) is one of the top school rowing clubs in the UK, and among the best sculling schools in the country. Rowers compete at regional and national school events and the club has produced several medallists in international competitions. The club is based in a boathouse situated on the Thames in Windsor, originally built by the Imperial Service College. The club's quad teams have won the Fawley Challenge Cup at the Royal Henley Regatta seven times in recent history, with the last two wins in 2017 and 2018.

Old Windsorians
 Stephen Grey, British investigative journalist and author, known for revealing details of the CIA's programme of extraordinary rendition.
 Tony Hayward, British businessman and former chief executive of oil and energy company BP.
 Peter Jones, British entrepreneur and businessman, investor on the television programme Dragons' Den.
 Martin Kemp, British art historian and Leonardo da Vinci specialist.
 Sir Peter James Luff, Chair of the National Heritage Memorial Fund and the National Lottery Heritage Fund. Member of Parliament (1997- 2015), Defence Minister (2010-2012). 
 Joe Morrison, football presenter on channels TEN Sports, TEN Action+, and SONY SIX.
 Adam Freeman-Pask, British International rower, World Bronze medallist, European Silver medallist and London 2012 Olympian.
 Will Quince, British Conservative politician and lawyer, Member of Parliament for Colchester.
 Jack Stacey, football player for Premier League team Bournemouth F.C.
 Charles Delacourt-Smith, Baron Delacourt-Smith, CH (1917–72), British trade unionist and Labour Party politician.
 Alan West, Baron West of Spithead, retired admiral of the Royal Navy, Under-Secretary of State (2007–10), First Sea Lord and Chief of the Naval Staff (2002–06).

References

Upper schools in the Royal Borough of Windsor and Maidenhead
Boys' schools in Berkshire
Educational institutions established in 1908
1908 establishments in England
Academies in the Royal Borough of Windsor and Maidenhead